Our Barrio is a 2016 drama short film directed by Ryan Casselman and written by Casselman and Yvette Angulo. The film stars Angulo, Rick Mancia, Francisco Javier Gomez, Andrea Sevilla and Robby Perez. The film screened at Palm Springs International ShortFest and won awards at Oceanside International Film Festival and Riverside International Film Festival. It was distributed by Indieflix.

Plot 
Gabriela is on the verge of adulthood, living with her family in a diverse neighborhood. Grappling with her own name, she must find herself when her life comes to a halt.

Cast 

 Yvette Angulo
 Rick Mancia
 Francisco Javier Gomez
 Andrea Sevilla
 Robby Perez

Production 

Principal photography took place in Barrio Logan and City Heights. Most of the cast was Latino, from San Diego County and Los Angeles. The film was made to authentically represent the Latino community, political and social climate, and diverse communities.

Release 

Our Barrio screened at Palm Springs International ShortFest. The film was distributed by Indieflix.

Reception

Accolades

References

External links 
 
 

2016 short films
American drama short films
Films shot in San Diego
Films set in San Diego
Hispanic and Latino American drama films
2016 drama films
Films about Mexican Americans
2010s English-language films
2010s American films
Films about families
American political drama films
2010s political drama films